The 1973–74 NBA season was the 76ers 25th season in the NBA & 11th season in Philadelphia. The team improved from a league history worst 9 wins to 25 wins, thanks to a fruitful 1973 NBA Draft which yielded overall #1 pick Doug Collins.  Eventual 76er mainstays George McGinnis and Caldwell Jones were also selected by the team, but both would opt for the ABA.

Fred Carter was the team's leading scorer who averaged over 20 points a game & Doug Collins was a rookie on this squad who was the #1 overall draft choice from Illinois State in the 1973 draft.

Offseason

Draft picks

This table only displays picks through the second round.

Roster

Regular season

Season standings

z – clinched division title
y – clinched division title
x – clinched playoff spot

Record vs. opponents

Game log

References

Philadelphia
Philadelphia 76ers seasons
Philadel
Philadel